Pseudopostega truncata is a moth of the family Opostegidae. It is only known from central Brazil.

The length of the forewings is about 3.8 mm. Adults are mostly white with almost entirely white forewings. Adults have been collected in December and January.

Etymology
The species name is derived from the Latin truncus (cut off) in reference to the truncate apex of the caudal lobe of the male gnathos.

External links
A Revision of the New World Plant-Mining Moths of the Family Opostegidae (Lepidoptera: Nepticuloidea)

Opostegidae
Moths described in 2007